Dobrino is a village in the municipality of Zelenikovo, North Macedonia.

Demographics
As of the 2021 census, Dobrino had 10 residents with the following ethnic composition:
Persons for whom data are taken from administrative sources 10

According to the 2002 census, the village had a total of 90 inhabitants. Ethnic groups in the village include:
Albanians 89
Others 1

References

External links

Villages in Zelenikovo Municipality
Albanian communities in North Macedonia